Joseph R. "Tim" Boggan is an American table tennis player, official, and historian.

In 1971, Boggan travelled to China as an official attached to the US Table Tennis team. The visit, referred to as 'ping pong diplomacy' by the media, marked a thawing in US-China relations.

In 1985, he was inducted into the USA Table Tennis Hall of Fame. In 1996, he received the Hall of Fame's Lifetime Achievement Award. He is the organisation's resident historian.

References
 USA Table Tennis Hall of Fame

External links
 Reproduction of 1996 interview for Table Tennis World

American male table tennis players
Living people
Year of birth missing (living people)